The Stevenot Bridge carries State Route 49 over New Melones Lake between Calaveras and Tuolumne Counties in the U.S. state of California and was completed in 1976. It is named after Archie Stevenot, who helped found the California Chamber of Commerce.

References 

Bridges completed in 1976
Road bridges in California
1976 establishments in California